Kennedy Nzechukwu  (born June 13, 1992) is a Nigerian mixed martial artist who competes in the Light Heavyweight division of the Ultimate Fighting Championship.

Background
Nzechukwu moved from Nigeria to the United States with his family in 2010. He started training mixed martial arts when his mother brought him to Fortis MMA in 2015 to learn some discipline. He attended college, but dropped out in order to pursue a career in mixed martial arts  after his mother was diagnosed with ALS.

Mixed martial arts career

Early career
After his amateur career, Nzechukwu turned professional, racking two straight victories in the Xtreme Knockout organization. He was then invited to compete in the Dana White's Contender Series. His bout took place on August 22, 2017, at Dana White's Contender Series 7 against Anton Berzin. He won the bout via split decision but did not receive a contract to the UFC.

He then returned to the regional circuit and notched two knockout victories in XKO and Legacy Fighting Alliance.

Dana White's Contender Series
Nzechukwu was then invited a second time to Dana White's Contender Series, this time facing Dennis Bryant at Dana White's Contender Series 16 on August 7, 2018. He won the bout via first-round knockout and received a UFC contract.

Ultimate Fighting Championship

Nzechukwu made his UFC debut against Paul Craig on March 30, 2019, at UFC on ESPN 2. He lost the fight via triangle choke in the third round.

Nzechukwu faced Darko Stošić on August 3, 2019, at UFC on ESPN: Covington vs. Lawler. He won the fight via unanimous decision.

Nzechukwu faced Carlos Ulberg on March 6, 2021, at UFC 259. Ulberg started strong, hurting Nzechukwu badly with strikes and kicks, but quickly became exhausted, resulting in Nzechukwu winning the fight via knockout in round two. This fight earned him the Fight of the Night award.

Nzechukwu faced Danilo Marques, replacing Ed Herman on June 26, 2021, at UFC Fight Night 190. After largely being controlled for most of the bout, he rallied and won the fight via TKO in the third round. This fight earned him the Performance of the Night award.

Nzechukwu was scheduled to face Da Un Jung on October 16, 2021, at UFC Fight Night 195. However, the bout was postponed to UFC Fight Night 197 on November 13, 2021, for unknown reasons. Nzechukwu lost the fight via knockout in round one.

Nzechukwu, as a replacement for Ihor Potieria, faced Nicolae Negumereanu on March 5, 2022, at UFC 272. He lost the fight via split decision. 8 out of 15 media scores gave it to Nzechukwu, while 6 scored it a draw, with only one giving it to Negumereanu.

Nzechukw faced Karl Roberson on July 9, 2022, at UFC on ESPN 39. He won the fight via technical knockout in round three.

Nzechukwu faced Ion Cuțelaba on November 19, 2022, at UFC Fight Night 215. He won the fight via technical knockout in round two. With this win, Nzechukwu earned the Performance of the Night award.

Nzechukwuis scheduled to face Devin Clark on May 6, 2023, at UFC 288.

Championships and accomplishments

Mixed martial arts 
 Ultimate Fighting Championships
 Fight of the Night (One time) 
Performance of the Night (Two times)

Mixed martial arts record

|-
|Win
|align=center|11–3
|Ion Cuțelaba
|TKO (knee and punches)
|UFC Fight Night: Nzechukwu vs. Cuțelaba
|
|align=center|2
|align=center|1:02
|Las Vegas, Nevada, United States
|
|-
|Win
|align=center|10–3
|Karl Roberson
|TKO (elbows)
|UFC on ESPN: dos Anjos vs. Fiziev
|
|align=center|3
|align=center|2:19
|Las Vegas, Nevada, United States
|
|-
|Loss
|align=center|9–3
|Nicolae Negumereanu
|Decision (split)
|UFC 272
|
|align=center|3
|align=center|5:00
|Las Vegas, Nevada, United States
|
|-
|Loss
|align=center|9–2
|Da Un Jung
|KO (elbows)
|UFC Fight Night: Holloway vs. Rodríguez
|
|align=center|1
|align=center|3:04
|Las Vegas, Nevada, United States
|
|-
|Win
|align=center|9–1
|Danilo Marques
|TKO (punches)
|UFC Fight Night: Gane vs. Volkov
|
|align=center|3
|align=center|0:20
|Las Vegas, Nevada, United States
|
|-
|Win
|align=center|8–1
|Carlos Ulberg
|KO (punches)
|UFC 259
|
|align=center|2
|align=center|3:19
|Las Vegas, Nevada, United States
|
|-
|Win
|align=center|7–1
|Darko Stošić
|Decision (unanimous)
|UFC on ESPN: Covington vs. Lawler
|
|align=center|3
|align=center|5:00
|Newark, New Jersey, United States
|
|-
|Loss
|align=center|6–1
|Paul Craig
|Submission (triangle choke) 
|UFC on ESPN: Barboza vs. Gaethje
|
|align=center|3
|align=center|4:20
|Philadelphia, Pennsylvania, United States
|
|-
|Win
|align=center|6–0
|Dennis Bryant
|TKO (head kick and punches)
|Dana White's Contender Series 16
|
|align=center|1
|align=center|1:48
|Las Vegas, Nevada, United States
|
|-
|Win
|align=center|5–0
|Corey Johnson
|TKO (punches)
|LFA 40
|
|align=center|2
|align=center|1:18
|Dallas, Texas, United States
|
|-
|Win
|align=center|4–0
|Andre Kavanaugh
|TKO (punches)
|XKO 40
|
|align=center|1
|align=center|2:40
|Dallas, Texas, United States
|
|-
|Win
|align=center|3–0
|Anton Berzin
|Decision (split)
|Dana White's Contender Series 7 
|
|align=center|3
|align=center|5:00
|Las Vegas, Nevada, United States
|
|-
|Win
|align=center|2–0
|Thai Walwyn
|Decision (unanimous)
|XKO 34
|
|align=center|3
|align=center|5:00
|Dallas, Texas, United States
|
|-
|Win
|align=center|1–0
|Matt Foster
|TKO (punches)
|XKO 33
|
|align=center|1
|align=center|2:06
|Dallas, Texas, United States
|

See also 
 List of current UFC fighters
 List of male mixed martial artists

References

External links 
  
 

1992 births
Living people
Nigerian male mixed martial artists
Heavyweight mixed martial artists
Light heavyweight mixed martial artists
Ultimate Fighting Championship male fighters
Sportspeople from Imo State
Nigerian emigrants to the United States